The Nussey Baronetcy, of Rushwood Hall in the County of York, was a title in the Baronetage of the United Kingdom. It was created on 22 July 1909 for Thomas Nussey, Liberal Member of Parliament for Pontefract from 1893 to 1910. The title became extinct on the death of the second Baronet in 1971.

Nussey baronets, of Rushwood Hall (1909)
Sir Thomas Willans Nussey, 1st Baronet (1868–1947)
Sir Thomas Moore Nussey, 2nd Baronet (1898–1971)

References
Kidd, Charles, Williamson, David (editors). Debrett's Peerage and Baronetage (1990 edition). New York: St Martin's Press, 1990.

Extinct baronetcies in the Baronetage of the United Kingdom